You Are My Starship  is an album by the Philadelphia, Pennsylvania jazz drummer Norman Connors. Released in 1976 on Buddah Records, it featured bass player/vocalist Michael Henderson and Philadelphia vocalist Phyllis Hyman. The album reached number five on the US R&B chart and number one on the Jazz chart.

The single, "You Are My Starship", charted at number four on the US R&B single chart. The boat on the front cover belonged to actor John Wayne.

Track listing
"We Both Need Each Other" (Michael Henderson) 4:07 Lead Vocals – Michael Henderson & Phyllis Hyman
"Betcha By Golly Wow"  (Linda Creed, Thom Bell)  6:17 Lead Vocals – Phyllis Hyman
"Bubbles"  (Shunzo Ono)  6:11  
'You Are My Starship"  (Michael Henderson)  4:23 Lead Vocals – Michael Henderson
"Just Imagine"  (Onaje Allan Gumbs) 3:58
"So Much Love"  (Norman Connors)  2:35 Lead Vocals – Norman Connors
"The Creator Has a Master Plan (Peace)" (Leon Thomas, Pharoah Sanders)  6:50

Personnel
Norman Connors - drums, timpani, arrangements
Michael Henderson - bass, vocals
Onaje Allan Gumbs - electric piano, string Arp synthesizer
Ian Underwood - string Arp synthesizer, Mini-Moog synthesizer
Hubert Eaves III - harpsichord, piano
Lee Ritenour, Keith Loving- guitar
Anthony Jackson, Larry McRae - bass
Tom Scott - melodica
Don Alias, Neil Clarke - percussion, congas
Carter Jefferson, Gary Bartz - alto and soprano saxophone
Earl McIntyre - trombone
Shunzo Ono - trumpet
Art Webb - flute
Doc Kirksey- cello
Mary Ellen Ewing - viola
Gayle Dixon Clay, John Blake, Noel Pointer - violin
Mareatha Stewart, Sharon Redd, Tasha Thomas - backing vocals

Charts

Singles

References

External links
 Norman Connors-You Are My Starship at Discogs

1976 albums
Norman Connors albums
Buddah Records albums